See also Vestfjorddalen (Svalbard).

Vestfjorddalen is a valley in Tinn, Norway, stretching from Lake Tinn westwards past Rjukan, Vemork and Rjukan Falls to Møsvatn. The Måna River runs through the entire valley.

Valleys of Vestfold og Telemark
Tinn